Buddha is an unincorporated community in Guthrie Township, Lawrence County, Indiana.  The local pronunciation of the name has traditionally been "boo-dee", rhyming with "Judy", though younger residents often pronounce it in line with the religious figure.

History
Though it was once known as Flinn's Crossroads, the origin of the town's current name is a subject of debate. The most prevalent story is that the name was suggested by a traveling salesman who stopped at the hamlet's store when it was only known by the street crossing that marked the downtown. Similarly, another story suggests the town was named for a rail traveling hobo who frequented the area. According to the story, the man was referred to as Buddha due to his short, heavy stature. Another story states that the name derives from some of the first settlers in the area, an English family named Bodey that operated a supply port on the East Fork of the White River one mile south of the crossroads, in what is now called Rivervale. That is supposedly how "Boo-dee" came about and eventually evolved into its present name. Buddha is the home of the White River Baptist Church, The Buddha store has been closed for several years but the name remains faded on the white block building that has been the site of a store and trading post for many generations Nearby Carlton Cemetery is the resting place of the remains of many pioneers of the area. Carrol Mathis was its long-time mayor from 1954 to 2010.

Geography
The East Fork of the White River is a little over a mile south and west of town, while Guthrie Creek is a mile to the north and east. The local terrain is hilly with patches of forest filled with sinkholes and many caves and caverns.

References

Unincorporated communities in Lawrence County, Indiana
Unincorporated communities in Indiana